Atsusina is a genus of moths belonging to the subfamily Olethreutinae of the family Tortricidae. It contains only one species, Atsusina curiosissima, which is found in Vietnam.

The wingspan is 12 mm. The ground colour of the forewings is pale brownish, mixed pink chiefly along the costa. The costal strigulae are indistinct and cream at the costa. The hindwings are brownish.

Etymology
The genus is named in honour of the late Dr. Atsusi Kawabe who specialized in this group of Olethreutinae. The specific epithet refers to curious male genitalia and is derived from Latin curiosissima (meaning most curious).

See also
List of Tortricidae genera

References

External links
tortricidae.com

Gatesclarkeanini
Monotypic moth genera
Moths of Asia
Taxa named by Józef Razowski

vi:Callibryastis